WRZN (720 kHz) is an AM radio station broadcasting a Christian radio teaching format for the Gainesville-Ocala, Florida media market. Licensed to Hernando, Florida, USA, the station broadcasts from a three tower directional antenna array located off State Highway 200, just north of Hernando.  It is owned by MARC Radio Gainesville, LLC.   Its studios are in a single wide mobile home located next to the transmitter towers on North Roscoe Road.  Programming is also simulcast on 1430 WTMN in Gainesville.  The stations call themselves "The Shepherd".

WRZN broadcasts at 10,000 watts by day with a non-directional antenna.  During daytime operation, the station can be heard in Ocala, Gainesville, and Tampa.  But at night, the station reduces power to 250 watts, using a directional antenna because 720 AM is a clear channel frequency reserved for Class A WGN in Chicago.

History
WRZN signed on in June 1989, owned by Management and Marketing Synergy Inc, whose principals were Frank Watson and Clay Brinker. Andrew Blackburn was the original Operations Manager that set up operations manual and programming using the Gold format from The Satellite Music Network. In 2000, the station was sold to Pamal Broadcasting as a part of a multi-station market purchase in the Gainesville-Ocala market.  WRZN was purchased by Marc Radio in 2011.  In early November 2011, WRZN became Fox News Talk 720.  In 2016 it switched to a religious format.

References

External links

RZN
Radio stations established in 1989
1989 establishments in Florida